Emanuel Rieder (born 1 October 1993) is an Italian luger. He competed in the Men's singles luge event at the 2014 Winter Olympics in Sochi, placing 19th.

References

External links

1993 births
Living people
Sportspeople from Brixen
Italian lugers
Italian male lugers
Lugers at the 2014 Winter Olympics
Lugers at the 2018 Winter Olympics
Lugers at the 2022 Winter Olympics
Olympic lugers of Italy